The 1853 New Zealand general election was a nationwide vote to determine the shape of the New Zealand Parliament's 1st term. It was the first national election ever held in New Zealand, although Parliament did not yet have full authority to govern the colony, which was part of the British Empire at that time. Elections for the first provincial councils and their Superintendents were held at the same time.

Background

The New Zealand Constitution Act 1852, passed by the Parliament of the United Kingdom, established a bicameral New Zealand Parliament, with the lower house (the House of Representatives) being elected by popular vote. Votes were to be cast under a simple FPP system, and the secret ballot had not yet been introduced.

To qualify as a voter, one needed to be male, to be a British subject, to be at least 21 years old, to own a certain value of land, and to not be serving a criminal sentence. One of the candidates elected (on 27 August, for Christchurch Country) was a landowner, but at 20 years and 7 months was not yet 21: he was James Stuart-Wortley.

At the time of the 1853 elections, there were no political parties in New Zealand. As such, all candidates were independents.

The election
In the 1853 elections, election day was different in each seat. The first seat to be elected was Bay of Islands on 14 July, and the final election day was on 1 October. Hugh Carleton (Bay of Islands) was the first MP ever elected in New Zealand (though he was elected unopposed), so he liked to be called the Father of the House.

There were 5,849 people registered to vote. The number of electoral districts was 24, and some districts elected multiple MPs. The total number of seats was 37. Some parts of the colony were not part of any district, and did not have representation in Parliament.

Results

References

Bibliography